Cracking the Particle Code of the Universe: The Hunt for the Higgs Boson is a 2014 popular science book by Canadian physicist John Moffat. The first half of the book gives the reader an explanation of the particle physicists' Standard Model and the physical concepts associated with it, together with some possible alternatives to, and extensions of, the Standard Model. In the second half of the book, Moffat gives his personal account (up to March 2013) of how the discovery of the Higgs boson actually happened at the Large Hadron Collider (LHC). He writes about conferences he attended and interviews with some of the LHC physicists.

The book received favorable reviews from Sabine Hossenfelder in Physics World and from Michael Peskin in Physics Today

See also
Reinventing Gravity, 2008 book by Moffat
Einstein Wrote Back, 2010 book by Moffat

References

Popular physics books
2014 non-fiction books
Oxford University Press books